Make Like a Thief is a 1964 Finnish-American film.

Production
The film was a Finnish-US co production. Long said he made the film because it was a job, and it gave him the chance to direct and see Finland.

It was filmed during a strike by Finnish filmmakers; the producers received a special dispensation to make the movie.

References

External links

1964 films
English-language Finnish films
Finnish multilingual films
American multilingual films
American crime films
Finnish crime films
1964 crime films
1960s multilingual films
1960s English-language films
1960s American films